The 2003 Belgian Figure Skating Championships took place between 29 and 30 November 2002 in Leuven. Skaters competed in the disciplines of men's and ladies' singles.

Senior results

Men

Ladies

External links
 results

Belgian Figure Skating Championships
2002 in figure skating
Belgian Figure Skating Championships, 2003